Vidoe Podgorec (8 June 1934 – 14 April 1997) was a Macedonian writer and poet. He was born in Kolešino near Strumica and lived in Skopje. He wrote for children and adults and published a great number of poems, stories and novels.

One of his most famous novels is The White Gypsy (Белото циганче).

References
Macedonia FAQ

1934 births
Yugoslav writers
Writers from Skopje
Macedonian poets
1997 deaths
20th-century poets
People from Novo Selo Municipality